Gabriela Sůvová (born 8 February 1972) is a Czech biathlete. She competed at the 1992 Winter Olympics and the 1994 Winter Olympics.

References

1972 births
Living people
Biathletes at the 1992 Winter Olympics
Biathletes at the 1994 Winter Olympics
Czech female biathletes
Olympic biathletes of Czechoslovakia
Olympic biathletes of the Czech Republic
Sportspeople from Jablonec nad Nisou